Alhaj Mohammad Alam Izedyar
was selected to represent Panjshir Province in Afghanistan's Meshrano Jirga, the upper house of its National Legislature, in 2005.
He has a B.A. in Political Science.
He is the Secretary of the Legislature's International Relations Committee.
He is a supporter of Abdullah Abdullah.

His son Salem was killed on June 2, 2017 when police reportedly shot at protesters near the presidential palace in Kabul.

His son Saalem tore down president Karzai's poster from the Loya Jirga hall and is being accused of damaging public property.

References

Politicians of Panjshir Province
Living people
Members of the House of Elders (Afghanistan)
1963 births